Wagner Renan Ribeiro (born 14 November 1987, in Vukovar) is a Croatian retired footballer.

Career
The midfielder played professional for Panionios F.C. in the Greek Super League.

In the 2010-11 season of the Qatar Stars League, Wagner saved his team, Al Ahli from getting relegated, first by scoring the only goal against Al-Sailiya in the pre-relegation playoff, and then by scoring a hat trick against Al Shamal in the relegation playoff.

References

External links

 

1987 births
Living people
Sportspeople from Vukovar
Croatian people of Brazilian descent
Association football midfielders
Croatian footballers
Brazilian footballers
Panionios F.C. players
Al Ahli SC (Doha) players
El Jaish SC players
Al-Arabi SC (Qatar) players
Al-Sailiya SC players
Super League Greece players
Qatar Stars League players
Qatari Second Division players
Croatian expatriate footballers
Brazilian expatriate footballers
Expatriate footballers in Greece
Brazilian expatriate sportspeople in Greece
Expatriate footballers in Qatar
Brazilian expatriate sportspeople in Qatar